Violence occurred in the aftermath of the 2021 West Bengal Legislative Assembly election, which the ruling Trinamool Congress won for a third consecutive term.

Major events 
After the announcement of results of the 2021 West Bengal Legislative Assembly election, declaring that the incumbent Trinamool Congress government would be returning to power for the third time, violence broke out in some parts of West Bengal. In reality it was continuation of the violence which took place across the state during the election.

The BJP claimed that at least six of its workers were killed during attacks by workers of the ruling Trinamool Congress. Five TMC workers were also allegedly killed in these attacks. The governor summoned the Director of General Police and Kolkata Police Commissioner to discuss the situation. Congress leader Jitin Prasada alleged that Congress members were attacked and even women and children weren't spared from the attacks by TMC. He called out Mamata Banerjee to stop this violence immediately. Leaders of CPI (M)  alleged that their workers had also been attacked by the TMC. In Khanakul, a TMC worker was reportedly hacked to death.

Union Ministry of Home Affairs sought a report from the Government of West Bengal over incidents of post-election brutality against opposition political workers in the state.

Udayan Guha, TMC candidate from Dinhata and former Dinhata MLA was attacked by miscreants in Dinhata on 6 May. Guha suffered a hand fracture and other injuries. TMC blamed BJP for this attack. FIR was lodged against 15 men and among them 4 were arrested by 10 May. Nearly one month after undergoing surgery, Guha returned to Dinhata from Kolkata. He questioned the role of the police, as those accused in the attack on him were still elusive.

On 5 May, after taking oath as the Chief Minister for a third term, Mamata Banerjee reinstated state police officers who were transferred by the Election Commission. On 10 May, a five-judge special bench of Calcutta High Court expressed satisfaction over the action taken by the newly formed Mamata Banerjee government in West Bengal to restore normality after post-results violence in pockets of the state.

Senior minister in Assam government Himanta Biswa Sarma claimed that hundreds of BJP worker's families had crossed the West Bengal-Assam border to seek shelter in Assam away from the violence against them. He called this violence as "ugly dance of Democracy".

Many women, including a minor girl, were allegedly raped by TMC workers as their family members voted against them. Allegedly, a 60-year-old woman was raped and her daughter-in-law was beaten up by TMC goons; their account moved to Supreme court.

In September 2021, Manas Saha, BJP candidate from Magrahat who was allegedly beaten up by TMC workers and sustained serious head trauma died in hospital and BJP demanded a CBI probe into the issue.

In some areas TMC leaders and workers came to the bring back homeless BJP workers to their homes after they were attacked in the post poll violence but they were not helped in this initiative by BJP leaders. These workers claimed that they were attacked, looted, shops and furniture damaged. BJP leaders claimed that these rescue activities were money deals made under fear but TMC has disputed this claim. In other places, TMC leaders helped BJP workers open their shops again after elections but BJP disputes that claim, stating that the workers were attacked. In May, a BJP worker had died due to Cardiac arrest and TMC workers helped his family cremate him but BJP workers did not even respond to help pleas. There were multiple other instances where after the natural death of BJP workers, TMC workers and leaders helped them to cremate or bury them respectfully.

In Bankra Mishra Para in Domjur, defector BJP workers were purified by sprinkling Ganga water in the presence of the Trinamool MLA Kalyan  Ghosh himself before joining TMC which attracted criticism from BJP. Another 200 members from BJP who had joined the party shortly before the elections rejoined the TMC claiming that "BJP wasn't on their side in the day of danger" and returned to their TMC.

In an organizational meeting of the BJP, two factions of the party clashed with each other in the presence of Dilip Ghosh and Sukanta Majumdar. The protesters alleged that the state BJP leadership did not come to their rescue when they were assaulted by TMC workers in post-poll violence.

Investigation 
The BJP leadership of East Burdwan had submitted a list to the police demanding the return of refugee workers of their party. According to police sources, most of the people mentioned in the lists, provided by the BJP in each police station in the district, have been sent back to their home. DSP (Headquarters) Souvik Patra said "There are many on the list who have gone out (of the state) for work. They works all year in the outlying states. They have also been included in this list. It is being represented as if they are not able to return home." Aminul Islam Khan, SDPO of South Burdwan (Sadar), said "Those who do not want to return home are also being put on the list of refugee people."

BJP members had also brought an elderly man, who had gone to attend his grandson's initiation ceremony, to the National Human Rights Commission in Kolkata.

BJP alleged that their workers had been tortured by TMC activists of Bhagabanpur constituency in Purba Medinipur. But it was later learned that in reality TMC supporters were oppressed by BJP workers under the influence of Rabindranath Maity, BJP MLA of the said constituency. A huge crowd attended TMC's rally in Bhagabanpur on 10 July to protest against BJP, state irrigation minister Somen Mahapatra calling it a "reign of terror".

Frances Haugen, a former Facebook employee, revealed before the United States Senate that RSS users, groups and pages had used Facebook to spread violence and communal unrest across West Bengal by promoting anti-Muslim narratives on the platform.

On 3 January 2022, the CBI rejected 21 cases of molestation and rape after it failed to gather enough evidence. But it continues to investigate 39 cases of rape and molestation, 52 cases of murder or unnatural death and has submitted 10 charge sheets for murders/unnatural deaths. On 28 January 2022, 7 people were sent to judicial custody for 14 days for conspiring and murdering BJP worker Manik Moitra during the post poll violence. The CBI had earlier filed a charge sheet against six accused in the case.

References

2021 West Bengal Legislative Assembly election
Violence in India
2021 in Indian politics